Check it Out! is a Canadian television sitcom, which aired on CTV from September 1985 to April 1988. The series also aired in the United States in syndication and on the USA Network.

Synopsis
Based on the British series Tripper's Day, Check It Out! was set in a fictional supermarket called Cobb's, located in Brampton, Ontario and stars Don Adams as manager Howard Bannister. The cast also included Dinah Christie, Henry Beckman, Gordon Clapp, Barbara Hamilton, Elizabeth Hanna, Kathleen Laskey, Jeff Pustil, Simon Reynolds, Aaron Schwartz and Tonya Williams. The series was taped in front of a studio audience at CFTO-TV in Toronto.

Cast
Don Adams as Howard Bannister
Dinah Christie as Edna Moseley
Aaron Schwartz as Leslie Rappaport
Elizabeth Hanna as T.C. Collingwood 
Tonya Williams as Jennifer Woods (season 1)
Jeff Pustil as Jack Christian
Kathleen Laskey as Marlene Weimaraner
Henry Beckman as Alf (season 1)
Simon Reynolds as Murray Amherst (seasons 1–2)
Gordon Clapp as Viker (seasons 2–3)

Episodes

Season 1 (1985-86)

Season 2 (1986-87)

Season 3 (1987-88)

Syndication
In 2008, four episodes of the series were featured on WGN America's "Outta Sight Retro Night" programming block. As of 2013, the program is seen on Comedy Gold in Canada daily. Streaming on Tubi

International titles
In Argentina the show was called Supermercado 99 ("Supermarket 99"), a reference to Barbara Feldon's character in Get Smart, while in Italy, the show was called Il supermercato più pazzo del mondo ("The most crazy supermarket in the world").

In Sweden, comical duo Stefan & Krister star in Full Frys, a TV series largely based on Check it Out! and Tripper's Day.

References

External links
 

1985 Canadian television series debuts
1988 Canadian television series endings
1980s Canadian sitcoms
1980s Canadian workplace comedy television series
Canadian television series based on British television series
CTV Television Network original programming
English-language television shows
Television shows filmed in Toronto
Television series set in shops